David Kirker Martin (1 February 1914 – 10 January 1991), known as Boy Martin or Davy Boy Martin, was a Northern Irish professional football centre forward, best remembered for his spells in the Football League with Nottingham Forest, Wolverhampton Wanderers and Notts County. He was capped by Ireland at full and amateur level. After retiring from football, Martin coached at Ballymena United and Carrick Rangers.

In September 1933, Martin scored both of goals as Ireland defeated Scotland 2–1 in a full British Home Championship international. Two weeks later he got another brace, this time for the Irish League XI in Belfast when they won 3–0 over the Scottish Football League XI.

Personal life 
Martin served as a drummer boy in the Royal Ulster Rifles, where he acquired his nickname, "Boy". He re-enlisted in the British Army early in the Second World War and was wounded in Normandy in 1944.

Honours 
Belfast Celtic
 Irish League: 1932–33

See also 
 List of men's footballers with 500 or more goals

References 

Association footballers from Northern Ireland
NIFL Premiership players

Association football forwards
1914 births
Association footballers from Belfast
Ballymena United F.C. players
English Football League players
Cliftonville F.C. players
Northern Ireland amateur international footballers
1991 deaths
Belfast Celtic F.C. players
Wolverhampton Wanderers F.C. players
Nottingham Forest F.C. players
Irish League representative players
Notts County F.C. players
Watford F.C. wartime guest players
Aldershot F.C. wartime guest players
Fulham F.C. wartime guest players
Ballymoney United F.C. players
Royal Ulster Rifles soldiers
British Army personnel of World War II
Pre-1950 IFA international footballers